Lepnica is a village in the municipalities of Orašje (Federation of Bosnia and Herzegovina) and Donji Žabar (Republika Srpska), Bosnia and Herzegovina.

Demographics 
According to the 2013 census, its population was 85, with 47 living in the Donji Žabar part and 38 in the Orašje part.

References

Populated places in Donji Žabar
Populated places in Orašje